The High School for Gifted Students, Hanoi University of Science, Vietnam National University (abbrev. High School for Gifted Students of Science or HSGS, in Vietnamese: Trường THPT chuyên,  Đại học Khoa học Tự nhiên, Đại học Quốc Gia Hà Nội, as commonly known Chuyên Tổng hợp or Chuyên Tự nhiên) is a specialized, most-selective (6% acceptance rate) public magnet school of Hanoi University of Science. The school serves as a national educational institution to nurture talented Vietnamese students who excelled at natural sciences. The largest percentage of its graduates attend the most prestigious universities in Vietnam.

The department of Mathematics was established first in 1965, followed by the department of Physics; the department of Chemistry and Biology was established in 1998.

HUS High School for Gifted Students is ranked the first in  International Science Olympiads (IMO, IOI, IPhO, IChO, and IBO).. This is also the high school where Professor Ngô Bảo Châu, the first Vietnamese recipient of the Fields medal, studied.

Foundation and history
In September 1965, renowned Vietnamese mathematician and Professor Hoàng Tụy, supported by Professor Lê Văn Thiêm, Professor Ngụy Như Kon Tum, Professor Tạ Quang Bửu and Prime Minister Phạm Văn Đồng, founded the Special class of Mathematics with 38 students at the temporary war-time evacuation location of University of Hanoi in Đại Từ District, Thái Nguyên Province. This class was the precursor of HUS High School for Gifted Students.

From 1966 to 1985, the school had the name Specialized School of Mathematics and Informatics, which were under the administration of the faculty of Mathematics, Mechanics, Informatics - Hanoi University of Science.

In 1998: Specialized School of Science.

In June 2010: the High School for Gifted Students, Hanoi University of Science.

The HUS High School for Gifted Students was honored with national awards: the 3rd degree Labor Decoration in 1985, the 2nd degree Labor Decoration in 1995, the 1st degree Labor Decoration in 2000; the Independence Decoration and the Hero of Labor in 2005.

Education

Most notably, the school's mathematics and science curriculums are accelerated, and a 3-year standard curriculum at normal public high schools is condensed into the 2.5-year specialized curriculum and the 0.5-year College Entrance Exam preparation. The school also offers honours courses in the Specializations (see below) to further stretch the abilities of able students beyond the already-accelerated curriculum. 

The HUS High school for Gifted Students now comprises six specializations:

Mathematics
Informatics
Physics
Chemistry
Biology
High Quality

Each department, led by a head of department, had been under the administration of a faculty of Hanoi University of Science until 2010. In 2010, the name High School for Gifted Students was officially used with the establishment of an independent high school under the direct administration of HUS school board instead of each separate faculty.

In the National Science Olympiad, each of the departments chooses 10 talented students to represent VNU University of Science.

Current school board:
Principal: Lê Công Lợi, PhD. 
Deputy Principals:
Phạm Văn Quốc, PhD.
Vi Anh Tuấn, PhD.

Facilities

Campus

The HUS High school for Gifted Students is located on Me Tri Campus, at 182nd Luong The Vinh Str., Thanh Xuân District, Hanoi. The campus comprises three buildings: the Main Building with 12 classrooms and the school office; the C3 building with offices of departments, laboratories and computer rooms; and the B1 building with some other classrooms. For all places on the campus, WiFi is available.

Library

Students use Me Tri library of Vietnam National University, Hanoi for studying.

Multipurpose Court

The school uses the multipurpose court of Hanoi University of Science to organize physical education exercise and other sports activities.

Notable alumni
Academia
Ngô Bảo Châu, Professor of Mathematics, University of Chicago, Clay Research Award (2004), Fields Medal (2010).
Đàm Thanh Sơn, Professor of Physics, University of Chicago, formerly of University of Washington.
Trần Xuân Bách, Professor, Johns Hopkins Bloomberg School of Public Health, Noam Chomsky Award (2020).
 Hà Huy Tài, Chair of Mathematics Department, Tulane University.
 Lê Hùng Việt Bảo, Professor of Mathematics, Northwestern University.
 Cao Vũ Dân, Professor of Economics, Georgetown University.
 Nguyễn Minh Hoài, Professor of Computer Science, Stony Brook University.
 Phùng Hồ Hải, Director of Institute of Mathematics Hanoi (IMH).
 Prof. Dr Đào Trọng Thi, former president of Vietnam National University, Hanoi (2001-2007).
Government
Prof. Dr. Trần Văn Nhung, former vice-minister of Ministry of Education and Training.
Assoc. Prof. Dr. Bùi Thế Duy, vice-minister of Ministry of Science and Technology.
Business
Nguyễn Thành Nam, former general director of FPT Group.

Achievements

College admission
99% of HUS High school students pass the annual university entrance examination and are admitted to universities in Vietnam. The average entrance score of HUS High school students is always high on top of Vietnam, with HNUE High school for gifted students, Hanoi-Amsterdam High School, VNU-HCM High School for the Gifted

National Olympiads
Every year, the HUS High school attended the National Olympiads representing Vietnam National University, Hanoi and received about 50 prizes.

International Olympiads

International Mathematical Olympiad
16th IMO in German Democratic Republic (1974):
Hoang Le Minh: Gold medal
Dang Hoang Trung: Bronze medal
17th IMO in Bulgaria (1975):
Nguyen Minh Duc: Silver medal
Phan Vu Diem Hang: Bronze medal
Nguyen Long: Bronze medal
18th IMO in Austria (1976):
Nguyen Thi Thieu Hoa: Silver medal
21st IMO in United Kingdom (1979):
Pham Ngoc Anh Cuong: Silver medal
23rd IMO in Hungary (1982):
Tran Minh: Silver medal
Nguyen Huu Hoan: Bronze medal
25th IMO in Czechoslovakia (1984):
Đàm Thanh Sơn: Gold medal
26th IMO in Finland (1985):
Nguyen Tien Dung: Gold medal
27th IMO in Poland (1986):
Nguyen Tuan Trung: Bronze medal
Phung Ho Hai: Bronze medal
28th IMO in Cuba (1987):
Doan Quoc Chien: Bronze medal
Nguyen Huu Tuan: Bronze medal
29th IMO in Australia (1988):
Ngô Bảo Châu: Gold medal
30th IMO in Germany (1989):
Ngô Bảo Châu: Gold medal
Bui Hai Hung: Silver medal
Ha Huy Minh: Bronze medal
31st IMO in China (1990):
Pham Xuan Du: Silver medal
32nd IMO in Sweden (1991):
Ha Huy Tai: Silver medal
Nguyen Hai Ha: Bronze medal
33rd IMO in Russia (1992):
Nguyen Xuan Dao: Gold medal
Nguyen Quoc Khanh: Silver medal
Nguyen Thanh Cong: Silver medal
Nguyen Thuy Linh: Bronze medal
34th IMO in Turkey (1993):
Nguyen Chu Gia Vuong: Gold medal
35th IMO in Hong Kong (1994):
Dao Hai Long: Gold medal
Tran Ngoc Nam: Silver medal
Nguyen Quy Tuan: Silver medal
Nguyen Chu Gia Vuong: Silver medal
To Dong Vu: Silver medal
36th IMO in Canada (1995):
Ngo Dac Tuan: Gold medal
Dao Hai Long: Gold medal
Nguyen The Trung: Silver medal
Pham Quang Tuan: Silver medal
37th IMO in India (1996):
Ngo Dac Tuan: Gold medal
Nguyen Thai Ha: Gold medal
Pham Le Hung: Silver medal
Do Quoc Anh: Bronze medal
38th IMO in Argentina (1997):
Do Quoc Anh: Gold medal
Pham Le Hung: Silver medal
Nguyễn Ánh Tu: Silver medal
39th IMO in Taiwan (1998):
Pham Huy Tung: Silver medal
Dao Thi Thu Ha: Bronze medal
40th IMO in Romania (1999):
Bui Manh Hung: Gold medal
Pham Tran Quan: Silver medal
Nguyen Trung Tu: Silver medal
41st IMO in South Korea (2000):
Bui Viet Loc: Gold medal
Nguyen Minh Hoai: Gold medal
Do Duc Nhat Quang: Gold medal
Cao Vu Dan: Silver medal
42nd IMO in United States (2001):
Le Anh Vinh: Silver medal
43rd IMO in United Kingdom (2002):
Pham Hong Viet: Silver medal
44th IMO in Japan (2003):
Le Hung Viet Bao: Gold medal
45th IMO in Greece (2004):
Pham Kim Hung: Gold medal
Le Hung Viet Bao: Gold medal
46th IMO in Mexico (2005):
Pham Kim Hung: Silver medal
Nguyen Truong Tho: Bronze medal
47th IMO in Slovenia (2006):
Hoang Manh Hung: Gold medal
Dang Bao Duc: Bronze medal
48th IMO in Vietnam (2007):
Pham Duy Tung: Gold medal
50th IMO in Germany (2009):
Ha Khuong Duy: Gold medal
51st IMO in Kazakhstan (2010):
Vu Dinh Long: Silver medal
Nguyen Minh Hieu: Bronze medal
 54th IMO in Colombia (2013):
 Tran Dang Phuc: Silver medal
 55th IMO in ChiLe (2014):
 Nguyen The Hoan: Gold Medal
 56th IMO in ThaiLand (2015):
 Nguyen The Hoan: Gold Medal
 Nguyen Tuan Hai Dang: Silver Medal

There are seven (7) students who won two gold medals: Ngô Bảo Châu (1988–89), Dao Hai Long (1994–95), Ngo Dac Tuan (1995–96), Vu Ngoc Minh (2001-2002), Le Hung Viet Bao (2003-04), Pham Tuan Huy (2013-2014), Nguyen The Hoan (2014-2015) and 5 students scored 42/42 point (the highest point): Đàm Thanh Sơn (1984), Ngô Bảo Châu (1988), Ngo Dac Tuan (1995), Do Quoc Anh (1997), Le Hung Viet Bao (2003).

Asian Pacific Mathematics Olympiad
1995-1996:
Ngo Dac Tuan: Gold medal
Nguyễn Ánh Tu: Silver medal
Nguyen Ba Hung: Bronze medal
Mai Phu Son: Bronze medal
Nguyễn Hoàng Dụong: Bronze medal
Dinh Thanh Trung: Bronze medal
2000-2001:
Le Anh Vinh: Gold medal
Tran Minh Quan: Bronze medal

International Olympiad in InformaticsVietnam in International Olympiad in Informatics
1st IOI in Bulgaria (1989):
Nguyễn Anh Linh: Bronze medal
2nd IOI in USSR (1990):
Tran Hoai Linh: Silver medal
Nguyễn Anh Linh: Bronze medal
Nguyen Viet Ha: Bronze medal
3rd IOI in Greece (1991):
Dam Hieu Chi: Bronze medal
4th IOI in Germany (1992):
Ha Cong Thanh: Bronze medal
Le Van Tri: Bronze medal
5th IOI in Argentina (1993):
Pham Viet Thang: Bronze medal
6th IOI in Sweden (1994):
Truong Xuan Nam: Silver medal
Tran Minh Chau: Silver medal
Pham Bao Son: Silver medal
7th IOI in Netherlands (1995):
Pham Bao Son: Silver medal
Bui The Duy: Bronze medal
8th IOI in Hungary (1996):
Bui The Duy: Bronze medal
Nguyen Thuc Duong: Bronze medal
9th IOI in South Africa (1997):
Vuong Phan Tuan: Silver medal
10th IOI in Portugal (1998):
Tran Tuan Anh: Bronze medal
11th IOI in Turkey (1999):
Nguyen Ngoc Huy: Gold medal
12th IOI in China (2000):
Nguyen Ngoc Huy: Gold medal
Pham Kim Cuong: Silver medal
14th IOI in South Korea (2002):
Nguyen Van Hieu: Silver medal
15th IOI in United States (2003):
Nguyen Le Huy: Gold medal
Cao Thanh Tung: Silver medal
Pham Tran Duc: Bronze medal
Dinh Ngoc Thang: Bronze medal
16th IOI in Greece (2004):
Le Manh Ha: Bronze medal
18th IOI in Mexico (2005):
Tran Tuan Linh: Bronze medal
19th IOI in Croatia (2007):
Doan Manh Hung: Silver medal
Nguyen Hoanh Tien: Bronze medal
23rd IOI in Thailand (2011):
Nguyen Vuong Linh: Gold medal
Le Khac Minh Tue: Silver medal
24th IOI in Italy (2012):
Vu Dinh Quang Dat: Silver medal
25th IOI in Australia (2013):
Duong Thanh Dat: Silver medal
26th IOI in Taiwan (2014)
 Ngo Hoang Anh Phuc: Silver medal
 Do Xuan Viet: Bronze medal
 Nguyen Tien Trung Kien: Bronze medal
27th IOI in Kazakhstan (2015)
 Pham Van Hanh, Gold medal
 Phan Duc Nhat Minh, Silver medal
 Nguyen Viet Dung, Silver medal
 Nguyen Tien Trung Kien: Silver medal
28th IOI in Russia (2016)
 Phan Duc Nhat Minh, Gold medal
 Pham Cao Nguyen, Gold medal

International Physics Olympiad

24th IPhO in United States (1993):
Thai Thanh Minh: Bronze medal
26th IPhO in Australia (1995):
Vo Van Duc: Silver medal
Tran The Trung: Bronze medal
27th IPhO in Norway (1996):
Tran The Trung: Gold medal
Nguyen Duc Trung Kien: Silver medal
Nguyen Quang Hung: Silver medal
28th IPhO in Canada (1997):
Nguyen Duc Trung Kien: Silver medal
Pham Tuan Minh: Bronze medal
Bui Van Diep: Bronze medal
29th IPhO in Iceland (1998):
Vu Tri Khu: Bronze medal
Bui Van Diep: Bronze medal
Nguyen Trung Thanh: Bronze medal
30th IPhO in Italy (1999):
Ngo Quang Tien: Silver medal
Nguyen Thanh Lam: Silver medal
Pham Xuan Thanh: Silver medal
Dao Tung Lam: Silver medal
Nguyen Thanh Trung: Bronze medal
31st IPhO in United Kingdom (2000):
Tran Việt Bắc: Bronze medal
32nd IPhO in Turkey (2001):
Nguyen Bao Trung: Gold medal
Dang Ngoc Duong: Bronze medal
33rd IPhO in Indonesia (2002):
Dang Ngoc Duong: Gold medal
Luong Tuan Thanh: Silver medal
Nguyen Huy Thanh: Bronze medal
34th IPhO in Taiwan (2003):
Nguyen Huu Thuan: Bronze medal
35th IPhO in South Korea (2004):
Nguyen Hai Chau: Silver medal
Trinh Hong Phuc: Bronze medal
36th IPhO in Spain (2005):
Nguyen Minh Hai: Silver medal
Van Sy Chien: Bronze medal
Nguyen Quang Huy: Bronze medal
37th IPhO in Singapore (2006):
Tran Xuan Quy: Bronze medal
38th IPhO in Iran (2007):
Do Hoang Anh: Silver medal
39th IPhO in Vietnam (2008):
Do Hoang Anh: Gold medal
45th IPhO in Kazakhstan (2014):
Do Thi Bich Hue: Gold medal
Dao Phuong Khoi: Silver medal
48th IPhO in Indonesia (2017):
Ta Ba Dung: Gold medal
International distributed Physics Olympiad in Russia (2020):
Vu Ngo Hoang Duong: Silver medal
Le Minh Hoang: Silver medal
Trang Dao Cong Minh: Silver medal
51st IPhO in Lithuania (2021):
Trang Dao Cong Minh: Gold medal
52nd IPhO in Switzerland (2022):
Le Minh Hoang: Gold medal
Vu Ngo Hoang Duong: Gold medal
Vo Hoang Hai: Gold medal

International Chemistry Olympiad

29th IChO in Canada (1997):
Nguyen Ngoc Bao: Silver medal
35th IChO in Greece (2003):
Vu Viet Cuong: Bronze medal
36th IChO in Germany (2004):
Vu Viet Cuong: Silver medal
Nguyen Mai Luan: Silver medal
Ha Minh Tu: Bronze medal
37th IChO in Taiwan (2005):
Nguyen Mai Luan: Gold medal
Nguyễn Hoàng Minh: Gold medal
Nguyen Huy Viet: Silver medal
38th IChO in South Korea (2006):
Đang Tien Duc: Gold medal
Tu Ngoc Ly Lan: Gold medal
Nguyễn Hoàng Minh: Silver medal
39th IChO in Russia (2007):
Nguyen Thi Ngoc Minh: Gold medal
40th IChO in Hungary (2008):
Vu Minh Chau: Gold medal
Pham Anh Tuan: Bronze medal
41st IChO in United Kingdom (2009):
Vu Minh Chau: Gold medal
45th IChO in Russia (2013):
Phan Quang Dung: Gold medal
Ho Quang Khai: Silver medal
Nguyen Quoc Anh: Silver medal
48th IChO in Georgia (country) (2016):
Đinh Quang Hieu: Gold medal
49th IChO in Thailand (2017)
Đinh Quang Hieu: Gold medal
Pham Đuc Anh: Gold medal
50th IChO in Czech Republic and Slovakia (2018)
Pham Đuc Anh: Gold medal
52nd IChO in Turkey (Virtually conducted) (2020)
Nguyen Hoang Duong: Gold medal
53rd IChO in Japan (Virtually conducted) (2021)
Nguyen Hoang Duong: Silver medal

International Biology Olympiad

12th IBO in Brussels, Belgium (2001):
Nguyen Anh Vu: Bronze medal
Nguyen Kim Nu Thao: Bronze medal
13th IBO in Jūrmala-Riga, Latvia (2002)
Nguyen Van Nhuong: Bronze medal
14th IBO in Minsk, Belarus (2003)
Tran Thu Huong: Bronze medal
Nguyen Minh Huong: Bronze medal
16th IBO in Beijing, China (2005)
Nghiem Viet Dung: Bronze medal
Do Thi Hong Van: Bronze medal
17th IBO in Río Cuarto, Argentina (2006)
Tran Thi Thu Thuy: Bronze medal
18th IBO in Saskatoon, Canada (2007)
Duong Thi Thu Phuong: Bronze medal
20th IBO in Tsukuba, Japan (2009)
Nguyen Thi Thuy Trang: Silver medal
24th IBO in Bern, Switzerland (2013):
Nguyen Quang Huy: Bronze medal
27th IBO in Hanoi, Vietnam (2016):
Vu Thi Chinh: Gold Medal
28th IBO in Coventry, England (2017)
Nguyen Phuong Thao: Silver medal
29th IBO in Shiraz, Iran (2018)
Nguyen Phuong Thao: Gold medal (1st place)
30th IBO in Szeged, Hungary (2019)
Ha Vu Huyen Linh: Silver medal 
31th IBO in Nagasaki, Japan (Virtually conducted as IBO challenge I) (2020):
Dong Ngoc Ha: Silver medal 
Ha Vu Huyen Linh: Bronze Medal

References

External links
Official website of the HUS High School for Gifted Students
Official forum of the HUS High School's students
Web page of the School of Mathematics and Informatics - HUS High School for Gifted Students
Trường Trung học phổ thông chuyên Khoa học Tự nhiên, Đại học Quốc gia Hà Nội
List of typical students of Hanoi University of Science

High schools in Hanoi
High schools for the gifted in Vietnam
University-affiliated secondary schools